Dandume (or Dan Dume) is a Local Government Area in Katsina State, Nigeria.

It has an area of 422 km and a population of 145,739 at the 2006 census. And also dandume local government people are engaged in agricultural activities 
They are people with the same cultural background

The postal code of the area is 830.

References

Local Government Areas in Katsina State